Gene Wars may refer to:
 The Gene Wars universe, a science fiction and fantasy universe developed by C. J. Cherryh
 The science fiction short story "Gene Wars" by Paul J. McAuley
 Genewars, a Bullfrog Productions strategy game from 1996
 Ethnic bioweapon, a weapon that harms people having certain genes